Carpolestes is a genus of extinct primate-like mammals from the late Paleocene of North America. It first existed around 58 million years ago. The three species of Carpolestes appear to form a lineage, with the earliest occurring species, C. dubius, ancestral to the type species, C. nigridens, which, in turn, was ancestral to the most recently occurring species, C. simpsoni.

Carpolestes had flattened fingernails on its feet but with claws on its fingers.  Morphologically it supports Robert Sussman's theory of the co-evolution of tropical fruiting Angiosperms and early primates where Angiosperms provide nectar and fruits in return for dispersing the seed for tropical rainforest plants.  It appears to have been a distant relative of the Plesiadapiforms such as Plesiadapis.

References 

Plesiadapiformes
Prehistoric placental genera
Eocene primates
Ypresian life
Thanetian life
Wasatchian
Clarkforkian
Paleocene mammals of North America
Fossils of the United States
Paleontology in Montana
Paleontology in Wyoming
Fossil taxa described in 1928
Taxa named by George Gaylord Simpson